The Expendables 4 (stylized as Expend4bles) is an upcoming American action film directed by Scott Waugh, with a script co-written by Kurt Wimmer, Tad Daggerhart and Max Adams, from an original story by Kurt Wimmer, Spenser Cohen and Tad Daggerhart. It is the fourth installment in The Expendables franchise and the sequel to The Expendables 3 (2014), starring an ensemble cast including Jason Statham, Dolph Lundgren, Randy Couture, and Sylvester Stallone reprising their roles from previous films, alongside 50 Cent, Megan Fox, Andy García, Tony Jaa, Jacob Scipio, Iko Uwais, Levy Tran and Eddie Hall.

Statham, Avi Lerner, Les Weldon, Yariv Lerner, and Kevin King serve as producers. The film will retain an R rating like the first two films in the franchise. The film is scheduled to be released in the United States on September 22, 2023, by Lionsgate.

Premise 
The film depicts a nuclear conflict between Russia and the United States that the Expendables are drawn into.

Cast 

 Sylvester Stallone as Barney Ross: The leader of the Expendables. Stallone confirmed that the film would be his final appearance as Barney Ross, with Statham expecting to take over the series after his departure. Due to this, his role in the film was limited.
 Jason Statham as Lee Christmas: The team's knife expert. As Stallone was looking to pass the franchise's lead on to Statham, he did about 80% of all filming and oversaw post-production, also serving as a producer.
 Dolph Lundgren as Gunner Jensen: A volatile member of the team, undone by years of combat stress. Lundgren stated that his character has been sober for several years now and is on a philosophical soul search.
 Randy Couture as Toll Road: The team's demolitions expert.

Additionally, Curtis "50 Cent" Jackson, Megan Fox, Tony Jaa, Jacob Scipio, Levy Tran, Sheila Shah and Eddie Hall have been cast in undisclosed roles. Iko Uwais has been cast as the lead villain, while Andy García plays a CIA agent.

Production

Development 
After The Expendables 3 underperformed at the box office, the future of the series was left in doubt and production stalled over several years. By November 2014, it was announced that the project is being developed with intent to retain its R-rating like the first two films. In December 2016, Sylvester Stallone announced that the fourth installment will be the final film in the series, while a scheduled tentative release date was set for 2018. By March 2017, Stallone had left the project and the franchise, due to creative differences over the script and direction for continuing the franchise. In January 2018, after vocal support from other cast members (including Arnold Schwarzenegger), Stallone announced his return to the series with a post to his social media platforms; confirming new developments on the fourth movie.

By August 2020, Vértice Cine announced their involvement as a production studio on the movie, alongside Lionsgate and Millennium Films. They also revealed that Patrick Hughes will return to the series as director. In November 2020, the president of Millennium Media, Jeffrey Greenstein, stated that the studio is continuing to work on The Expendables 4 after various delays within the industry worldwide due to the COVID-19 pandemic. In August 2021, The Hollywood Reporter reported that Scott Waugh would be directing the film, replacing Hughes, as well as Statham serving as a producer of the film, while Stallone confirmed his involvement with the project, and that The Expendables 4 was the same project as The Expendables: A Christmas Story, previously reported as a spin-off but in fact the film's working-title during development. Stallone further stated that production was set to commence in October of that year. According to Dolph Lundgren, the film had a budget of $100 million.

Writing 
In July 2018, Gregory Poirier announced his role as screenwriter. Production was tentatively scheduled to begin by April 2019, though it wasn't until July of that year that Stallone announced that he was continuing to work on the script for the project. The script was completed later that year, though negotiations with producers were ongoing. In August 2021, it was announced that Spenser Cohen wrote the most recent draft of the script with Max Adams, from a story by Cohen.

Casting
Over the years, multiple actors reported interest or claimed they were approached to star in a fourth installment. In March 2014, Pierce Brosnan stated that he had agreed with producer Avi Lerner to star in a fourth installment. By April of the same year, Sylvester Stallone revealed his first choice for the villain was Jack Nicholson, while mentioning his interest in convincing Clint Eastwood to join the production. According to Jackie Chan, he was approached to star in the film by Stallone but was unsure about having limited screen time in an ensemble film, which is why he had turned down roles in the previous two entries. Dwayne Johnson publicly expressed interest to play a villainous character in a new installment during a 2014 Q&A and reiterated his interest to join the series in 2022. In May 2015, Hulk Hogan claimed that he was in talks with Stallone to play the film's main villain.

In June 2020, Jean-Claude Van Damme expressed interest in returning to the franchise, publicly pitching his idea of playing Claude Vilain, the brother to his villain character, Jean Vilain, from The Expendables 2. Despite discontent with how his character was handled in The Expendables 3, Arnold Schwarzenegger proclaimed he was interest in returning to the series if he liked the script. While he was not included in the fourth movie, Kellan Lutz proclaimed interest to return in a fifth installment in an Instagram post. On the other hand, Terry Crews, who had starred in all previous films, refused to appear in any new entries after claiming he was sexually assaulted by Stallone's agent, Adam Venit, alleging he was pressured by producer Avi Lerner to drop the case if he wanted to stay in the series.

However, none of the actors mentioned above was subsequently cast, and the cast was announced to include returning stars Sylvester Stallone, Jason Statham, Randy Couture, and Dolph Lundgren, while new cast members were revealed to be Eddie Hall, Curtis "50 Cent" Jackson, Megan Fox, Tony Jaa, Andy García, Sheila Shah, Jacob Scipio and Levy Tran, with Iko Uwais playing the villain.

Filming 
In August 2021, it was stated that principal photography would begin in October. Filming officially commenced on September 29, 2021. In October 2021, Stallone announced on social media that he had finished filming his scenes for the movie. The film was shot in London and Bulgaria and the Jackie Chan Stunt Team handled stunt choreography. In November 2021, production was shot in Greece, including the city of Thessaloniki. Members of the Greek Armed Forces were used as extras and alleged they were not compensated for their month-long official deployment, despite working overtime. On December 3, 2021, Tony Jaa confirmed filming had wrapped.

Release

Theatrical
The Expendables 4 is set to be theatrically released by Lionsgate on September 22, 2023. The film was originally scheduled to be released in 2022.

Marketing
In April 2022, the first standee posters for the film were unveiled at CinemaCon. The first teaser trailer footage was released exclusively to the attendees at Lionsgate's presentation at the convention.

References

External links
 

2023 action adventure films
2023 action thriller films
2023 films
American action adventure films
American action thriller films
American sequel films
American vigilante films
Fictional mercenaries
Films directed by Scott Waugh
Films postponed due to the COVID-19 pandemic
Films produced by Jason Statham
Films shot in Bulgaria
Films shot in England
Films shot in Greece
Films shot in London
Films shot in Thessaloniki
Films with screenplays by Spenser Cohen
Lionsgate films
The Expendables (franchise)
Upcoming sequel films
Upcoming films
2020s English-language films
Films produced by Avi Lerner
2020s American films